Serbia first participated at the Olympic Games in 1912 as the Kingdom of Serbia. Serbia returned to the Olympics as an independent team after ninety-six years at the 2008 Summer Olympics.

History 

Despite not participating in the first Olympic Games in 1896 in Athens, Serbian king Aleksandar Obrenović attended the Games at the invitation of Greek king George I. At these Games Momčilo Tapavica (born in today's Serbian province Vojvodina), who competed for Kingdom of Hungary, became the first athlete from today's territory of Serbia and the first ethnic Serb to win an Olympic medal, bronze in tennis. 

Serbian Olympic Club was established on February 23, 1910. Major Svetomir Đukić is considered the founder of the Olympic movement in Serbia. In 1912 the Club changed its name to the Olympic Committee of Serbia and that year it was recognized by the International Olympic Committee.

From the 1920 to the 1992 Winter Olympics, Serbian athletes participated as part of the Yugoslavian team. At the 1992 Summer Olympics they participated as Independent Olympic Participants as their nation was under United Nations sanctions. The continuing sanctions meant that no Serbian athletes competed at the 1994 Winter Olympics. Sanctions were mostly lifted in 1995.  From the 1996 Summer Olympics to the 2006 Winter Olympics Serbian athletes participated as part of the Serbia and Montenegro team.

Seven-time Olympian shooter and 1988 gold medalist Jasna Šekarić competed under four different banners during her twenty-four-year Olympic career. She started under the flag of Yugoslavia in 1988, then she competed as an Independent Participant in 1992, under the flag of Serbia and Montenegro from 1996 to 2004 and in 2008 and 2012 she represented Serbia.

Serbian former basketball player and administrator Borislav Stanković was the Secretary General of FIBA from 1976 to 2002, and a member of the International Olympic Committee. As Secretary General, he pushed for a change in FIBA's rules to allow players from the National Basketball Association (NBA) to compete at the Olympics. Prior to the 1992 Summer Olympics in Barcelona, only professionals in leagues other than the NBA were allowed to compete.

Participation

Timeline of participation

Medal tables

Medals by Summer Games

Medals by Winter Games

Medals by sport

List of medalists

Multiple medal winners
This is a list of people who have won two or more Olympic medals, who represented Serbia as an independent country at least once.

People in bold are still active competitors
Olympics in italic are medals won for the predecessor countries

Medal winners as medal winning coach

Predecessor countries

The Olympic Committee of Serbia, created in 1910 and recognized in 1912, is deemed the direct successor to both Yugoslav Olympic Committee and the Olympic Committee of Serbia and Montenegro by IOC. In the period from 1920 to 2006, athletes representing these defunct countries won a total of 99 medals: 95 at Summer Games and 4 at Winter Games.

See also
 List of flag bearers for Serbia at the Olympics
 :Category:Olympic competitors for Serbia
 Serbia at the Paralympics
 List of Yugoslav Olympic medalists

References

External links